Dorcadion irakense is a species of beetle in the family Cerambycidae. It was described by Al-Ali and Ismail in 1987. It is known from Iraq.

References

irakense
Beetles described in 1987